Otowako Hatsuse (初瀬 音羽子, February 7, 1902 - September 19, 1993) was the former member of the Takarazuka Girl's Revue Company. She was an actress who was the leader of the Moon Troupe.  Her real name was Shoji Yae. She was born in Hokkaido prefecture. When she joined the group, her stage name was Hatsuse Otowako (乙羽子).

life 
Otowako was born on February 7, 1902.
In 1918, after graduating from Tokyo Girls' High School (currently Tokyo Women's Gakuen Junior and Senior High School), Otowako joined the Takarazuka Girls' Revue Company (currently Takarazuka Revue Company) as a member of the 7th or 8th generation of the Takarazuka Revue Company. After that, Otowako served as the head of the Moon Troupe until 1928. In 1919, Otowako played the role of Yajirobe in Hizakurige. In 1920, Otowako played the role of a nanny in Kinpei Megane. In the same year, Otowako also played the role of Lord Yasumichi, the son of the Dainagon, in Rangiku Zoshi. In the same year, Otowako also played the role of a nanny in Onatsu Kasamo no Gurui. In 1921, Otowako played the role of Dainagon's second wife, Izuna, in Chikuma Shinji. In 1928, she left the Takarazuka Girls' Revue Company at the age of 26. After leaving the company, Otowako has been active as an actress in the Shinkokugeki, Otoha Hatsuse (初瀬 乙羽). In 1929, Otowako gained attention when she joined Shinkokugeki as an executive as the first actress to move from Takarazuka to another theater company. Otowako retired in the summer of 1983. In 1987, Otowako spent her life recuperating from illness. Otowako died on September 19, 1993. Aged 91. Otowako was also famous for the play "Kunisada Chuji".

References

1902 births
1993 deaths
Japanese actresses